Mehrili (also, Mehralı) is a village and municipality in the Shamkir Rayon of Azerbaijan.  It has a population of 2,048.  The municipality consists of the villages of Mehrili, Qaraqocalı, and Çaylı.

References 

Populated places in Shamkir District